Jos Hinsen (14 April 1931 in Rijkevorsel, Belgium – 15 March 2009 in Turnhout, Belgium) was a Dutch professional road bicycle racer.

Major results

1955
Tour de France:
Winner stage 7
1958
Rijkevorsel

References

External links

Official Tour de France results for Jos Hinsen

Dutch male cyclists
1931 births
2009 deaths
Dutch Tour de France stage winners
Cyclists from Antwerp Province
20th-century Dutch people